Faelo Zúñiga (born 16 June 1909, date of death unknown) was a Chilean swimmer. He competed in the men's 100 metre freestyle event at the 1928 Summer Olympics.

References

External links
 

1909 births
Year of death missing
Chilean male freestyle swimmers
Olympic swimmers of Chile
Swimmers at the 1928 Summer Olympics
20th-century Chilean people